Richard Bernard Huntley (born 5 January 1949) was an English professional footballer who played as a defender for Sunderland.

References

1949 births
Living people
Footballers from Sunderland
English footballers
Association football defenders
Sunderland A.F.C. players
Cambridge City F.C. players
Dunstable Town F.C. players
English Football League players